Mordellistena zululandiae is a species of beetle in the genus Mordellistena of the family Mordellidae, part of the superfamily Tenebrionoidea. It was discovered in 1965.

References

zululandiae
Beetles described in 1956